Tsukamurella spumae is a bacterium from the genus of Tsukamurella which has been isolated from foam from an activated sludge plant in England.

References

External links
Type strain of Tsukamurella spumae at BacDive -  the Bacterial Diversity Metadatabase	

Mycobacteriales
Bacteria described in 2003